Bhairavi is a Hindu goddess associated with the Mahavidyas.

Bhairavi may also refer to:

Music
Bhairavi (thaat), a basic thaat of Hindustani music from the Indian subcontinent
Bhairavi (Hindustani), a Hindustani classical heptatonic (Sampurna) raga
Bhairavi (Carnatic), a janya rāgam in Carnatic music

People
Bhairavi Desai, founder of the New York Taxi Workers Alliance
Bhairavi Goswami (born 1984), Indian actress and television host
Bhairavi Raichura, Indian television actress

Other uses
Bhairavi (film), a 1998 Hindi romantic film